El Tanque is a town and a municipality in the northwestern part of the island of Tenerife, one of the Canary Islands, and part of the province of Santa Cruz de Tenerife, Spain. It is located 6 km west of Icod de los Vinos and 53 km west of the island's capital Santa Cruz de Tenerife.

The population is 2,815 (2013) and the area is 23.65 km². The elevation is 480 m.

Historical population

References 

Municipalities in Tenerife